Asura asaphes is a moth of the  family Erebidae. It is found on Borneo, Java, Peninsular Malaysia and Sumatra. The habitat consists of lowland dipterocarp forests.

References

asaphes
Moths described in 1900
Moths of Asia